The Sï-Shen-Tsï Methodist Church (also spelled Sz Shen Tsz), also known as The First [Methodist] Church [of Chengtu], Gospel Church or Enguang Protestant Church, is a Protestant church situated on Sishengci North Street in the city of Chengtu, Sichuan Province (formerly romanized as Sz-Chuan or Szechwan, also referred to as "West China").

History 

The church was designed by Walter Small, a Victoria University graduate known as the "Mission's Builder". Its walls were made of solid brick. It was built in semi-native style with fine board floors, and seated three hundred persons. It was doubled in size in 1911. The building cost $1,000 in gold, a sum gifted by Jairus Hart, Esq., of Halifax, N.S.

At that time, the situation was not considered particularly good. The Jinjiang District, in where the church was erected, was comparatively poor, and had not the best reputation. But this had changed much by 1920. This change was due in part to the general growth of the city, in part to the opening of a new city gate in the near vicinity. According to Rev. Newton Ernest Bowles, Canadian missionaries believed this was in no small measure due to the general influence of the church itself.

The present church building covers an area of more than 3,000 square meters, with a usable area of more than 1,200 square meters. The height of the church is about 18 meters. The Sichuan Theological College is located next to the church.

See also 
 Omar Leslie Kilborn
 Methodism in Sichuan
 St John's Anglican Church, Chengtu

References

Bibliography 
 
 
 

Former Methodist churches
Protestant churches in Sichuan
19th-century Methodist church buildings
Churches in Chengdu
Canadian Methodist Mission